The following is a list of burial places attributed to Abrahamic figures according to various religious and local traditions. The locations listed are not based on factual evidence, but rather locations mentioned in the text of the Bible or oral traditions of indigenous peoples. Lebanon, Israel, the Palestinian territories, Iraq, Jordan, and Iran have put monuments on the grave locations in an attempt to preserve them as holy sites. Many sites have been transmitted from generation to generation and there are historical accounts from travelers which state their existence.

Figures mentioned in the Torah

Figures mentioned in the Nevi'im (Prophets)

Figures mentioned in the Ketuvim (Writings)

Figures mentioned in the New Testament

 The Mausoleum of the Roman Emperor Augustus
 The so-called Tomb of Caiaphas was discovered by accident in 1990 and subsequently excavated by archaeologists.
 Tomb of Herod the Great (discovered in 2007 by archaeologist Ehud Netzer after 35 years of searching)
Cathedral of Saint Andrew, Patras – Saint Andrew
Benevento Cathedral – claims partial relics of Saint Bartholemew
San Bartolomeo all'Isola – also claims Saint Bartholemew
Santiago de Compostela Cathedral – Saint James the Great
Cathedral of St. James, Jerusalem – Saint James the Less
Hierapolis – Saint Philip
Santi Apostoli, Rome – also claims James the Less and Philip
Basilica of Saint Paul Outside the Walls – Saint Paul
St. Peter's Basilica holds the relics of Saint Peter (in Saint Peter's tomb), and claims Saint Simon the Zealot and Saint Jude Thaddeus (under the St. Joseph altar)
Archbasilica of Saint John Lateran – claims the skulls of both Peter and Paul
 Tomb of Jesus (several sites)
St. Thomas Cathedral Basilica, Chennai – Saint Thomas
Basilica of San Tommaso Apostolo, Ortona – also claims Thomas
St. Matthias' Abbey – Saint Matthias
Umayyad Mosque, Damascus – John the Baptist (burial site recognised by both Christians and Muslims) 
 Basilica of St. John – original burial site of Saint John 
Akeldama, Jerusalem – Judas Iscariot
 Saint Mark's Coptic Orthodox Cathedral (Alexandria) – Saint Mark
 Tomb of the Virgin Mary (in Catholic tradition, Mary was assumed to heaven and has no tomb)
 Abbey of Santa Giustina – Saint Luke  (body)
 St. Vitus Cathedral – Saint Luke (head)
 Thebes, Greece – Saint Luke (original burial ground; claimed to still hold one rib)
Salerno Cathedral – Saint Matthew
Tomb of Lazarus - Lazarus
James Ossuary – claimed to hold the relics of James the Just
Termoli Cathedral – Saint Timothy
Church of Saint Titus, Heraklion – Saint Titus

Figures mentioned exclusively in the Quran

See also

 Burial places of founders of world religions
 List of artifacts in biblical archaeology
 List of Islamic prophets buried in Iran
 List of mausolea
 Lives of the Prophets
 Ohel (grave)

References

Biblical people
Abrahamic figures
Burial places of Biblical figures
Abrahamic figures
Biblical geography